Edouard Julien (born April 30, 1999) is a Canadian professional baseball infielder in the Minnesota Twins organization.

Career
Julien was drafted by the Philadelphia Phillies in the 37th round of the 2017 Major League Baseball Draft out of Cardinal-Roy Secondary School in Ancienne-Lorette, Quebec, Canada. He did not sign with the Phillies and played college baseball at Auburn University. In 2018, he played collegiate summer baseball with the Falmouth Commodores of the Cape Cod Baseball League, and returned to the league in 2019 with the Hyannis Harbor Hawks. He was drafted by the Minnesota Twins in the 18th round of the 2019 MLB Draft and signed. In 2019, he played for the Canadian national baseball team at the 2019 Pan American Games. During the games, he suffered an injury which required him to get Tommy John Surgery.

Because of the surgery and the COVID-19 pandemic, Julien didn't make his professional debut until 2021 with the Fort Myers Mighty Mussels. During the season he was promoted to the Cedar Rapids Kernels. He spent the 2022 season with the Wichita Wind Surge. He played in the 2022 Arizona Fall League, where he batted .365/.535/.683, and led the league in runs (21) and walks (20). After the season, the Twins added him to their 40-man roster.

Julien played for the Canadian national team at the 2023 World Baseball Classic. The Twins optioned him to the Triple-A St. Paul Saints to begin the 2023 season.

References

External links

Falmouth Commodores players
Hyannis Harbor Hawks players
Canada national baseball team players
2023 World Baseball Classic players
Auburn Tigers baseball players
Cedar Rapids Kernels players
Wichita Wind Surge players
Fort Myers Mighty Mussels players
Glendale Desert Dogs players
Baseball people from Quebec
Canadian expatriate baseball players in the United States
1999 births
Living people